Edward Pingua Zakayo (born 25 November 2001) is a Kenyan male long-distance runner who competes in the 5000 metres. He was the bronze medallist in that event at the 2018 Commonwealth Games.

Born in Narok, Zakayo said his aim in his running career was to help his mother out of poverty and pay for his education. In 2017, he won the Kenyan youth trials and was selected for the 2017 IAAF World U18 Championships, where he took a silver medal over 3000 metres in front of a home crowd in Nairobi. On 11 June 2018, he won the Kenya World U20 trials with a new personal best of 13:19 to qualify for the U20 World Championships in Finland.

International competitions

Personal bests
Outdoor

From World Athletics Profile

References

External links

2001 births
Living people
People from Narok County
Kenyan male long-distance runners
Commonwealth Games bronze medallists for Kenya
Commonwealth Games medallists in athletics
Athletes (track and field) at the 2018 Commonwealth Games
African Games medalists in athletics (track and field)
African Games silver medalists for Kenya
Athletes (track and field) at the 2019 African Games
African Championships in Athletics winners
World Athletics U20 Championships winners
Athletes (track and field) at the 2022 Commonwealth Games
Medallists at the 2018 Commonwealth Games